Jacqueline Lawrence may refer to:
 Jackie Lawrence (politician) (born 1948), British politician 
 Jacqueline Lawrence (canoeist) (born 1982), Australian slalom canoeist